The St. Sophia Ukrainian Orthodox Theological Seminary located in South Bound Brook, New Jersey, United States was established in 1975 through the foresight of Metropolitan Mstyslav of the Ukrainian Orthodox Church of the USA.

External links
St. Sophia Ukrainian Orthodox Theological Seminary at the web-site of the Ukrainian Orthodox Church of the USA

Eastern Orthodox seminaries
Ukrainian Orthodox Church of the USA
Eastern Orthodoxy in New Jersey
Seminaries and theological colleges in New Jersey
Educational institutions established in 1975
Ukrainian-American culture in New Jersey
Universities and colleges in Somerset County, New Jersey